Yuzhny is a rural locality (a village) in Oktyabrsky Selsoviet, Sterlitamaksky District, Bashkortostan, Russia. The population was 263 as of 2010. There are 3 streets.

Geography 
Yuzhny is located 30 km southwest of Sterlitamak (the district's administrative centre) by road. Pokrovka-Ozerki is the nearest rural locality.

References 

Rural localities in Sterlitamaksky District